Lanjevan (also Romanized as Lanjevān, Lanjavān, and Lenjovān) is a village in Sharabian Rural District, Mehraban District, Sarab County, East Azerbaijan Province, Iran. At the 2006 census, its population was 26, in 7 families.

References 

Populated places in Sarab County